Shell Creek is a tributary of the Bighorn River, approximately  long, in Wyoming in the United States. Lying entirely within Big Horn County, Shell Creek begins above the Shell Lakes in the Bighorn Mountains. It flows into the Bighorn River, a tributary of the Yellowstone River, just north of Greybull.

Watershed
About  are irrigated from Shell Creek itself. Also, the part of the creek is diverted above Shell and conveyed via pipeline to the town of Greybull as a municipal water supply.

Transportation
US 14, the Bighorn Scenic Byway, travels along Shell Creek through the canyon. This  modern highway is relatively young. Much of it was completed in the mid-1960s, with major improvements in the 1980s.

See also
Shell Falls

References

External links
State of Wyoming: Bighorn River Basin
U.S. Fish and Wildlife Service: Wind/Bighorn River Drainage

External links

Rivers of Wyoming
Tributaries of the Yellowstone River
Rivers of Big Horn County, Wyoming